Wuna, or Djerimanga, is an indigenous Australian people.

Wuna may also refer to: 

 WUNA (1480 AM), a radio station licensed to Ocoee, Florida
 Wuna language, an extinct indigenous language of Australia
 Wuna of Wessex (circa 8th century), Anglo-Saxon noblewoman and Christian saint